Flett Buttress is a rock crag rising to  northwest of Mount Haddington on James Ross Island. It provides the highest exposure of volcanic rock on the island. It was named by the UK Antarctic Place-Names Committee in 1987 after William R. Flett, a geologist on Operation Tabarin at Deception Island (Base Leader), 1943–44, and Hope Bay, 1944–45.

References 

Cliffs of James Ross Island